Graham Russell Avery (9 September 1929 – 14 March 2015) was a New Zealand racing cyclist.

Biography
Avery was born in 1929 in the Auckland suburb of Point Chevalier. His parents were Muriel Mary Russell (née Lindsay) and Norman West Avery, a carpenter.

He won the bronze medal in the men's sprint at the 1950 British Empire Games in Auckland.

He died on 14 March 2015.

References

1929 births
2015 deaths
Cyclists from Auckland
New Zealand male cyclists
Commonwealth Games bronze medallists for New Zealand
Cyclists at the 1950 British Empire Games
Commonwealth Games medallists in cycling
20th-century New Zealand people
Medallists at the 1950 British Empire Games